Woods Point is a small town in Victoria, Australia and is located on the banks of the Goulburn River.

History

The town began as a general store built by Henry Wood, to service the gold diggings around the recently discovered Morning Star Reef. Wood's Point Post Office opened on 1 December 1862. By 1864, only three years after the discovery of the gold reef, the area had become a thriving town with 36 hotels. The town was subdivided into numerous suburbs, such as Waverly, Piccadilly, Killarney, Richmond, and Morning Star Hill. Communication was established via a telegraph line to Jamieson, and two local papers were in circulation.

From the 1870s to 1890s, mining activity declined, and the population dropped to between 100 and 200. The mining industry was revived in the 1890s, and the population grew once again, with four hotels servicing the town. Much of the town had to be rebuilt following devastating bushfires in 1939. The Morning Star Mine continued operations until its closure in 1963.

Woods Point, due in part to its terrain, has on many occasions been threatened by bush fires. Most notably in 1939 when the town was completely decimated. In 2006 it was severely threatened but remained unharmed, whilst neighboring town Gaffney's Creek lost a number of houses.
In 2009 the town was threatened again by the "Black Saturday" fires, although the town emerged unscathed. The neighboring town of Marysville wasn't as fortunate.

The Woods Point Magistrates' Court closed on 1 November 1981, not having been visited by a Magistrate since 1970. Woods Point Primary School closed on 31 December 1998.

The general store in Woods Point closed its doors in late 2010 and a smaller version opened down the main street, just over the bridge. This store facilitates small grocery sales while the Commercial Hotel covers the unleaded fuel sales for motorbikes.

The earthquake was felt across the nation, including in Adelaide, Canberra and Launceston. Although this was the largest earthquake ever recorded in Victoria, it did not cause any significant damage in Woods Point

Location and features

The town now serves as a hub for recreational trail-bike and off-road four-wheel drive activities and contains one hotel and one general store/petrol station (which has closed down), Mini Golf course, tennis court and many camping areas, the most popular being J. H. Scott Reserve. There are two gold mines still active in the area surrounding the town.  The town is still only accessible by dirt roads. But has recently gained Telstra mobile service to the government's "black spot" program.

Morning Star, a publicly listed company, was operating the Morning Star mine, as well as other nearby projects, until it was placed into receivership in 2015. It is now currently (2020) owned by AuStar Gold Ltd.

A.1 Mine, just 20 mins out of town is also currently in operation by Kaiser Reef Ltd (2020).

Climate

Summer daytime temperatures are warm, but with cool mornings; winters are cold and very wet, with regular snowfalls.

See also
Yarra Track

References

External links

Geoscience Australia place names: Woods Point
Australian Places: Woods Point

Towns in Victoria (Australia)
Shire of Mansfield
Mining towns in Victoria (Australia)